Ian Seale (born 19 September 1954) is a Canadian sprinter. He competed in the men's 4 × 400 metres relay at the 1976 Summer Olympics.

References

1954 births
Living people
Athletes (track and field) at the 1976 Summer Olympics
Canadian male sprinters
Olympic track and field athletes of Canada
Athletes from Toronto